The Museum of Health Care of Uzbekistan is in Uzbekistan. It was established in order to contribute information about the medicine and hygiene among the Uzbek people in an interesting way.

About 
The Museum of Health Care of Uzbekistan was first established in 1973 for contributing health care information by professor Mikhail Yakovlevich Yarovinskiy, who was working in the Medical Academy of Moscow. The collection at The Museum is estimated to be about 12 thousand artefacts which are related to health care, house in 6 departments. Visitors can see the sculptures, documents which are related to modern medicine. In addition, there are artefacts which show facts from the history of medicine with photographs and archaeological findings. The most popular artefacts at the museum is the collection of surgery tools which were made by professionals who were inspired with the Ibn-Sina's historical writings. There are only five museums in this theme in post-Soviet Union Republics.

The walls at The Museum of Health Care of Uzbekistan are decorated in a Middle Ages eastern style, and there is a monument for the "Abu Ali Ibn Sina", who was one of the greatest medicine representatives of Uzbekistan. In the main parts of the building, the artefacts mainly concern the history of medicine and hygiene. Another big part of the building of The Museum is related to medical cleaning.

Location 
The Museum of Health Care of Uzbekistan is located in Istiklal Street Tashkent city, Uzbekistan.

See also 

State Museum of History of Uzbekistan
Tashkent Polytechnical Museum
The Museum of Communication History in Uzbekistan
Museum of Arts of Uzbekistan
Tashkent Museum of Railway Techniques
Museum of Geology, Tashkent
Art Gallery of Uzbekistan
The Alisher Navoi State Museum of Literature
Museum of Victims of Political Repression in Tashkent
State Museum of Nature of Uzbekistan
Tashkent Planetarium

References

External links 
Brochure about the museum in Russian
Article about the museum in Uzbek
Museums of Uzbekistan
Locations of museums in Uzbekistan
Information about the museums

Museums in Tashkent
Medical and health organisations based in Uzbekistan
Medical museums
1973 establishments in the Soviet Union